Kemnay railway station was a station on the Alford Valley Railway in Kemnay, Aberdeenshire, which opened in 1858 and closed in 1950.

References

Notes

Sources
 
 

Disused railway stations in Aberdeenshire
Railway stations in Great Britain opened in 1859
Railway stations in Great Britain closed in 1950
Former Great North of Scotland Railway stations
1859 establishments in Scotland
1950 disestablishments in Scotland